Leslie Pearce Abbott (9 June 1885 – 28 September 1947) was an Australian rules footballer who played with Collingwood, Carlton, Richmond, Melbourne, and South Melbourne. He was the first player to play for five different Victorian Football League (VFL) clubs. He also played for Port Melbourne, Brunswick and North Melbourne in the Victorian Football Association (VFA).

References

External links

Les Abbott's playing statistics from The VFA Project
Blueseum profile
DemonWiki profile

1885 births
Australian rules footballers from Victoria (Australia)
Collingwood Football Club players
Carlton Football Club players
Richmond Football Club players
Melbourne Football Club players
Sydney Swans players
Brunswick Football Club players
North Melbourne Football Club (VFA) players
Port Melbourne Football Club players
1947 deaths